The Chase is a 1991 crime drama television film starring Casey Siemaszko and Ben Johnson. It was directed by Paul Wendkos. The film is based on the true story of American bank robber Phillip Hutchinson, who robbed a bank, killed a police officer, and took a man hostage in a 1988 rampage in Denver, Colorado.

The film was released on February 10, 1991 to tie in with the three year anniversary of the rampage, which occurred on February 9, 1988. It was later released on DVD on November 26, 2001.

Plot
In January 1988, in Denver, Colorado, KCNC-TV helicopter pilot Mike Silva (Robert Beltran) flies over Denver to allow cameraman Jim Stair (Paul Borrillo) to get aerial shots of the area. Meanwhile, escaped convict Phillip Hutchinson (Casey Siemaszko), under the alias of Mark Taylor, has fled from Texas to reside in Denver, where he works as a car mechanic. While working in Denver, Hutchinson carries out various crimes, including the armed robbery of a local store and the mugging of a courier delivering some money, whom he beats up with a crowbar. A witness spots Hutchinson fleeing in a red Chevrolet K5 Blazer and reports it to the Denver Police Department, but Hutchinson has his coworker Tom (Jimmie F. Skaggs) repaint the vehicle brown. Through his coworker, Hutchinson meets a girl named Roxanne (Sheila Kelley), who he starts a relationship with, though he does not tell her about his criminal life. However, after he finds Roxanne has been going through his belongings, he chases her out of his apartment.

Denver PD Detective Bob Wallis (Barry Corbin) and Texan Detective Hammer (Gailard Sartain) investigate Hutchinson's activities. Wallis' son Dale (Anthony Tyler Quinn) is also a police officer, and his wife is expecting a baby. Wallis plans to retire soon to spend more time with his family and upcoming grandchild, as he regrets not being around for Dale when he was younger. Meanwhile, teenage girl Tammie (Ricki Lake), who works as a bank teller at the Rio Grande Operating Credit Union office, confides to a coworker that she is insecure about her appearance and lacks self-confidence. Another girl elsewhere, Gloria Whipple (Megan Follows), struggles to pay her bills and get to work on time, a struggle compounded by the lack of support from her drug-addicted boyfriend Julian (Daniel Quinn); unbeknownst to Julian, Whipple is pregnant.

A month later, on February 9, 1988, Wallis is now a grandfather and plans to retire, Tammie still works at the Union office, and Whipple reconnects with her estranged father (Paul Collins). On this particular date, Hutchinson decides to rob the Union office, planning to flee for Brazil. Holding up the bank with a handgun, he demands Tammie transfer the bank's money into his suitcase. Tammie activates a silent alarm to alert the police, but Hutchinson flees in his Blazer before they can arrive. Wallis and Hammer respond to the scene, as do Silva and Stair, who decide to fly over and record the ensuing pursuit.

Police intercept Hutchinson and attempt to cut him off, but fail. Wallis and Hammer attempt as well, but see that Hutchinson is heading directly for them and attempt to escape their cruiser. However, Wallis' seatbelt fails to release, and by the time he manages to get out, Hutchinson strikes him with the Blazer, killing him instantly. The pursuing officers lose sight of Hutchinson, but Silva and Stair remain overhead. Hutchinson crashes the Blazer and flees on foot, encountering Whipple and Julian and attempting to carjack them. Julian runs off while Whipple drives away, missing gunfire from Hutchinson. Continuing on, Hutchinson encounters John Laurienti (Ben Johnson) and his disabled daughter, and forces Laurienti to drive him away in his green Chevrolet C/K. Silva, realizing the police do not know what vehicle Hutchinson is in, and being unable to inform them, flies the helicopter directly in front of the truck and lands in front of them, forcing it to stop. Police are then alerted to Hutchinson's whereabouts and surround the truck. Laurienti is pulled from the vehicle unharmed, and Hutchinson is shot dead by police after attempting to shoot Laurienti and the officers.

In the aftermath, Whipple ends her relationship with Julian and is in a much stronger relationship with her father, who is supporting her during her pregnancy. Wallis' son Dale gives a speech at his father's funeral and breaks down over the sudden death of his father. Tammie, now self-confident, plans to head off to college. Laurienti survives and is given a new white truck on behalf of KCNC-TV.

Cast

Reception
Variety wrote that the film is unsubtle but recreates the event with "attention-getting incisiveness".  Ken Tucker of Entertainment Weekly rated it a letter grade of A− and wrote, "Terse and tense, The Chase is chilling."

References

External links
 

1991 films
1990s crime action films
1991 crime drama films
American television films
American chase films
Crime television films
Action television films
American films based on actual events
Films directed by Paul Wendkos
Films set in Colorado
1990s English-language films
1990s American films